Lee Bullen (born 29 March 1971) is a Scottish former professional football player and coach who is the current manager of Scottish Championship side Ayr United. In a career that spanned more than 20 years, Bullen played football professionally in Scotland, England, Australia, Greece and Hong Kong. Having started his career as a striker, Bullen converted to defence midway through his career, and was used in various other positions. Bullen was named as Sheffield Wednesday's greatest ever captain in a 2014 online poll.

Playing career
Bullen was born in Edinburgh. He started his career in Scotland with Dunfermline Athletic, but failed to make an appearance before moving to Penicuik Athletic, a Junior Football team. Bullen then spent time at Meadowbank Thistle, Stenhousemuir and Whitburn. After failing to become an established player at a professional club in Scotland, Bullen moved to Australia to pursue his footballing career, playing for CYC Stanmore and Wollongong Wolves.

During his time in Australia, Bullen was scouted by a Hong Kong football club, Kui Tan, and he made the switch to Hong Kong. He played in the Hong Kong Football League for 4 seasons in total, moving from Kui Tan to Golden then on to South China. On 26 May 1996, Bullen played for a Hong Kong XI side in an unofficial friendly against England in their build up to Euro 96.

In 1998 Bullen moved to Greece and spent two years at Kalamata in the Greek Football League.

In 2000 at the age of 29, Bullen returned to Scotland, signing for Dunfermline Athletic. Bullen spent five years at the Scottish club.

After leading Dunfermline to the Scottish Cup Final, Bullen moved to English club Sheffield Wednesday on a free transfer in the summer of 2004. He immediately became an integral part of their play-off push after making his debut on 7 August in a 3–0 defeat on the opening day of the season at Hillsborough against Colchester United and scoring his first goal the next game on 10 August, away at Blackpool to lead the team to a 2–1 victory. In November 2005 the Captain's armband was passed onto him by Chris Marsden who was forced into retirement by injury. Bullen finished his first season in Sheffield with seven league goals.

During his time at Sheffield Wednesday he played in all eleven positions for the Owls, including memorably in goal away at Millwall, and received The Wash & Go good sport award for his efforts.

In January 2008, Bullen was informed by Sheffield Wednesday manager Brian Laws that he would not have his contract renewed upon its expiry at the end of the 2007–08 season.

Bullen's final appearance for Sheffield Wednesday came in a crucial relegation battle against Leicester City on the penultimate game of the season which the Owls won 3–1, an injury sustained in this game denied him an appearance for the last match of the season versus Norwich City on 4 May 2008 and a chance to play at Hillsborough for the last time. He did however appear in the end of season lap-of-honour and received a spectacular reception from the fans. Bullen was given a Guard of honour by his Wednesday teammates as he left the pitch for the final time.

In May 2008, Bullen joined Scottish Premier League side Falkirk on a two-year deal. Bullen later became an assistant coach at Falkirk. He scored his only goal for Falkirk in a 2–0 win over Hamilton Academical in November 2009. He left Falkirk in October 2011 to move to Sheffield, where his wife runs an estate agency business.

Coaching career
In 2011, Bullen signed a deal to become a youth coach at his former club Sheffield Wednesday and was given the post of development squad head coach. In October 2015, he was promoted to the position of assistant manager at the club, working on first team coaching and organisation alongside head coach Carlos Carvalhal. Following the dismissal of Carvalhal on 24 December 2017, Bullen took temporary charge of the first team. Bullen once again took temporary charge of the first team on 21 December 2018, following the dismissal of Jos Luhukay.

On 2 January 2019, Steve Bruce was appointed as the new manager of the club. Sheffield Wednesday announced, that Bullen would still remain as part of the senior coaching set-up.

On 15 July 2019, Lee Bullen, for the third time, took temporary charge of the first team after Steve Bruce  resigned from Sheffield Wednesday to take charge at Newcastle United.

On 14 August 2020, it was confirmed as part of a coaching staff restructure, Bullen would become a coach of the U23 side.

On 7 January 2022, he was appointed the manager of Scottish Championship side Ayr United.

Career statistics

Managerial statistics

Honours
Instant-Dict
Hong Kong First Division: 1997–98

Sheffield Wednesday
Football League One play-offs: 2005

Individual
Hong Kong Top Footballer: 1994-95
Football League Good Sport Award: 2006

References

External links

1971 births
Footballers from Edinburgh
Living people
Association football defenders
Association football utility players
Scottish footballers
Scottish expatriate footballers
Expatriate footballers in Greece
British expatriates in Hong Kong
Expatriate footballers in Hong Kong
Stenhousemuir F.C. players
South China AA players
Dunfermline Athletic F.C. players
Sheffield Wednesday F.C. players
Falkirk F.C. players
British expatriates in China
Kalamata F.C. players
Scottish Football League players
Hong Kong First Division League players
Scottish Premier League players
English Football League players
Super League Greece players
Football League (Greece) players
Penicuik Athletic F.C. players
Falkirk F.C. non-playing staff
Whitburn Junior F.C. players
Scottish football managers
Sheffield Wednesday F.C. managers
Ayr United F.C. managers
English Football League managers
Sheffield Wednesday F.C. non-playing staff